Andrei Kim (born February 26, 1986, in Minsk, Byelorussian SSR, Soviet Union) is a Belarusian youth and Christian social activist sentenced to 1.5 years imprisonment and considered by many as political prisoner.

Andrei is a leader of the unregistered democratic youth organization Inicyjatyva that opposes president Alexander Lukashenko.

He was arrested after taking part in a demonstration on January 10, 2008. Following his arrest he was accused of assaulting a police officer.

On April 22, 2008, Andrei was sentenced to 1.5 years in jail.

External links 
 Andrei Kim on the website of "Inicyjatyva" (Russian)
 Andrei Kim's personal blog
 Andrei Kim, political prisoner

1986 births
Living people
Politicians from Minsk
Belarusian political prisoners
Belarusian democracy activists